Necdet Karababa is a Turkish politician and former leader of the Democratic Left Party.

He was elected leader of the Democratic Left Party at its general assembly held on March 7, 1988, following the resignation and leaving the politics of Bülent Ecevit some time before. He resigned from this post on December 28, 1988 after ongoing disagreements with Ecevit's spouse Rahşan. Necdet Karababa did not run for this position at the next party convention on January 15, 1989, and was succeeded by Bülent Ecevit, who returned to active politics again following strong demand by party members.

Karababa is married to Atifet Karababa and the couple has three children.

References

Living people
Democratic Left Party (Turkey) politicians
Leaders of political parties in Turkey
1935 births